Cyperus grandisimplex is a species of sedge that is endemic to parts of South America.

The species was first formally described by the botanist Charles Baron Clarke in 1908.

See also
 List of Cyperus species

References

grandisimplex
Taxa named by Charles Baron Clarke
Plants described in 1908
Flora of Brazil
Flora of Peru
Flora of Paraguay
Flora of Venezuela